Alan Barr (born 6 January 1946) is a former Australian rules footballer who played for Geelong in the Victorian Football League (now known as the Australian Football League). He played in the 1964 VFL Reserves Premiership.

References

External links
 
 

1946 births
Living people
Geelong Football Club players
Australian rules footballers from Victoria (Australia)